Friedmannia is a genus of green algae in the family Trebouxiaceae.

The genus name of Friedmannia is in honour of Emerich Imre Friedmann (1921-2007) (Hungarian born) American botanist (Phycology and Mycology),
Microbiology and Professor at Florida State University in Tallahassee.

References

External links

Trebouxiophyceae genera
Trebouxiophyceae
Trebouxiales